Råsen is a lake in the municipality of Nord-Odal in Innlandet county, Norway. The  lake lies just north of the village of Sand. The Norwegian County Road 181 runs along the southern end of the lake.

See also
List of lakes in Norway

References

Nord-Odal
Lakes of Innlandet